Players and pairs who neither have high enough rankings nor receive wild cards may participate in a qualifying tournament held one week before the annual Wimbledon Tennis Championships.

Qualifiers

  Monique Javer /  Niurka Sodupe
  Kumiko Okamoto /  Naoko Sato
  Manon Bollegraf /  Maria Lindström
  Leila Meskhi /  Natasha Zvereva

Lucky losers
  Karen Schimper /  Masako Yanagi

Qualifying draw

First qualifier

Second qualifier

Third qualifier

Fourth qualifier

External links

1987 Wimbledon Championships – Women's draws and results at the International Tennis Federation

Women's Doubles Qualifying
Wimbledon Championship by year – Women's doubles qualifying
Wimbledon Championships